Barton End is a village just south of Nailsworth, Gloucestershire, England.

Villages in Gloucestershire
Stroud District